Guernsey usually refers to either:

Guernsey, the island or, more rarely, the whole jurisdiction of the ten parishes including smaller offshore islands such as Lihou, Jethou and Herm.
Bailiwick of Guernsey, a Crown dependency composed of the jurisdictions of Guernsey, Alderney and Sark, as well as a number of smaller islands

Guernsey may also refer to:

Animals
Guernsey cattle, a breed of cattle
Golden Guernsey, a breed of goats

People
Frank Edward Guernsey (1866–1927), U.S. Representative from Maine (1908–1917)
Frank Guernsey (tennis) (1917–2008), American tennis player
George H. Guernsey (1839–1900), American architect from Montpelier, Vermont
Henry Guernsey Hubbard (1850–1899), American horticulturist, botanist, and entomologist
John Guernsey (born 1953), American bishop in the Anglican Church in North America
Lisa Guernsey (born 1971), American early education researcher, author, and former journalist
Otis Guernsey Jr. (1918–2001), American writer
Stephen Guernsey Cook Ensko (1896–1969), expert on American antique silver
Wellington Guernsey (1817–1885), Irish composer and poet

Places

United States
Guernsey, Indiana
Guernsey, Iowa
Guernsey, Ohio
Guernsey, Wyoming
Guernsey County, Ohio
Guernsey Dam, earthfill dam on the North Platte River in the U.S. State of Wyoming

Elsewhere
Guernsey, Saskatchewan, Canada
Mount Guernsey, an isolated mainly ice-covered mountain on the west coast of the Antarctic Peninsula

Arts, entertainment, and media
Guernsey (2005 film), Dutch film by Nanouk Leopold
The Guernsey Literary and Potato Peel Pie Society, 2008 novel
The Guernsey Literary and Potato Peel Pie Society (film), 2018 film adaptation

Clothing
Guernsey (Australian rules football), type of shirt worn by Australian rules football players
Guernsey (clothing), seaman's knitted woollen sweater, similar to a jersey

Ships
HMS Guernsey, the name of four ships of the Royal Navy, and two planned ones
HMS Guernsey (1696), 50-gun fourth rate ship of the line of the Royal Navy, launched in 1696
HMS Guernsey (P297), Island-class offshore patrol vessel of the Bangladesh Navy

Sport
Guernsey Cricket Board
Guernsey FA Cup
Guernsey F.C., association football
Guernsey RFC, rugby

Other uses
 Guernsey's, an auction house in New York City

See also
Gersey
Guerny